Amsinckia eastwoodiae is a species of fiddleneck known by the common name Eastwood's fiddleneck. It is endemic to California, where it grows in the varied plant habitat of the hills, mountains, valleys, and coastlines.

Amsinckia eastwoodiae is a bristly annual herb similar in appearance to the other fiddlenecks. Its coiled inflorescence has tubular orange flowers up to 2 centimeters long and 1.5 wide at the face.

References

External links
Jepson Manual Treatment - Amsinckia eastwoodiae
Amsinckia eastwoodiae - Photo gallery

eastwoodiae
Endemic flora of California
Flora of the Sierra Nevada (United States)
Natural history of the California chaparral and woodlands
Natural history of the Central Valley (California)
Natural history of the California Coast Ranges
Natural history of the Santa Monica Mountains
Plants described in 1917